Tierra ('Land') was a weekly newspaper published from Almería, Spain. It was close to the Social Revolutionary Party of J. A. Balbontín. It had a short existence, and was published during 1932.

References

1932 establishments in Spain
1932 disestablishments in Spain
Defunct newspapers published in Spain
Defunct weekly newspapers
Weekly newspapers published in Spain
Mass media in Almería
Publications established in 1932
Publications disestablished in 1932
Socialist newspapers
Spanish-language newspapers